Omid Tofighian (Persian: امید توفیقیان) is an Iranian-Australian philosopher and Honorary Research Associate at the University of Sydney. He is known for his research on ancient Greek philosophy and his translation of the award-winning book by Kurdish-Iranian asylum seeker Behrouz Boochani, No Friend But the Mountains from Persian into English.

Education and career
Tofighian graduated with a combined honours degree in philosophy and religious studies at the University of Sydney, and earned his PhD at the Leiden University in the Netherlands. He has worked as a university teacher at the Abu Dhabi University, in the UAE, was a visiting scholar at K.U. Leuven in Belgium and later became an assistant professor in philosophy  at the American University in Cairo.

 Tofighian works as a Honorary Research Associate for the Department of Philosophy at the University of Sydney. He is also a faculty member of Iran Academia as well as campaign manager for the "Why Is My Curriculum White? - Australasia" campaign. As an activist, he advocates for asylum seekers and refugees in Australia.

He has published works on Greek philosophy and mythology, adopting an interdisciplinary approach.

Tofighian's translated asylum seeker Behrouz Boochani's No Friend But the Mountains: Writing from Manus Prison, which was sent to him one WhatsApp message at a time, from Persian to English, leading to its publication in 2018. Writing about the process of working with Boochani on the translation (which took five years), Tofighian wrote:

Awards and recognition
He and colleagues were awarded the “Living Together Safely” grant by the federal Attorney-General's Department Grant from 2015 to 2016. In 2016 he was awarded the Dean's "Commendation for Excellence in First Year Teaching for Writing: Style and Method (WRIT1000)" at Sydney University, in the same year being nominated for the university's Faculty Overall Teaching Award.

Tofighian's translation of Boochani's No Friend But the Mountains: Writing from Manus Prison won Australia's richest literary prize, the Victorian Prize for Literature, as well as the Victorian Premier's Prize for Nonfiction, awarded by the Wheeler Centre, on 31 January 2019. The book later won further awards, including a special award at the New South Wales Premier's Literary Awards,

Publications

Author
Macpherson, R., Tofighian, O. "Preparing and Developing School Leaders in the Middle East: Mediating Westernization with Indigenous and Evidence-based Practice and Theory of Educative Leadership". In Jacky Lumby, Gary Crow and Petros Pashiardis (Eds.), International Handbook on the Preparation and Development of School Leaders, (pp. 383–409). New York: Routledge.  (2008)
 "Contemporary Liminal Encounters: Moving Beyond Traditional Plots in Majidi's Baran". In Asghar Seyed-Gohrab and Kamran Talattof (Eds.), Conflict and Development in Iranian Film, (pp. 103–116). Leiden: Leiden University Press.  (2013)

Translator

References

Further reading

External links
 

Iranian emigrants to Australia
Philosophy academics
Academic staff of the University of Sydney
Living people
1975 births
Place of birth missing (living people)
Academic staff of The American University in Cairo
Leiden University alumni
Scholars of ancient Greek philosophy
21st-century Australian philosophers